Ras-related protein Rab-26 is a protein that in humans is encoded by the RAB26 gene.

References

Further reading